Geert Deferm (born 6 May 1963 in Hasselt) is a Belgian former footballer.

Honours 
KV Mechelen

 Belgian First Division: 1988–89
 Belgian Cup: 1986–87 (winners), 1990-91 (runners-up), 1991-92 (runners-up)
 European Cup Winners Cup: 1987–88 (winners)
 European Super Cup: 1988
 Amsterdam Tournament: 1989
 Joan Gamper Trophy: 1989
 Jules Pappaert Cup: 1990

References

External links
 

Living people
1963 births
Belgian footballers
Association football defenders
K.F.C. Winterslag players
K.V. Mechelen players
Royal Antwerp F.C. players
K.A.A. Gent players
R.A.A. Louviéroise players
Amiens SC players
Belgian Pro League players
Ligue 2 players
Belgian expatriate footballers
Belgian expatriate sportspeople in France
Expatriate footballers in France
Sportspeople from Hasselt
Footballers from Limburg (Belgium)